The CESG Claims Tested Mark (abbreviated as CCT Mark or CCTM), formerly CSIA Claims Tested Mark,  is a UK Government Standard for computer security. 

The CCT Mark is based upon framework where vendors can make claims about the security attributes of their products and/or services, and independent testing laboratories can evaluate the products/services to determine if they actually meet the claims. In other words, the CCT Mark provides quality assurance approach to validate whether the implementation of a computer security product or services has been performed in an appropriate manner.

History 

The CCT Mark was developed under the auspices of the UK Government's Central Sponsor for Information Assurance (CSIA), which is part of the Cabinet Office's Intelligence, Security and Resilience (ISR) function.  The role of providing specialist input to the CCT Mark fell to CESG as the UK National Technical Authority (NTA) for Information Security, who assumed responsibility for the scheme as a whole on 7 April 2008.

Operation 

All Testing Laboratories must comply with ISO 17025, with the United Kingdom Accreditation Service (UKAS) carrying out the accreditation.

Comparisons 

The CCT Mark is often compared to the international Common Criteria (CC), which is simultaneously both correct and incorrect:

Both provide methods for achieving a measure of assurance of computer security products and systems
Neither can provide a guarantee that approval means that no exploitable flaws exist, but rather reduce the likelihood of such flaw being present 
The Common Criteria is constructured in a layered manner, with multiple Evaluation Assurance Level (EAL) specifications being available with increasing complexity, timescale and costs as the EAL number rises
Common Criteria is supported by a Mutual Recognition Agreement (MRA), which, at the lower EAL numbers at least, means that products tested in one country will normally be accepted in other markets
The CCT Mark is aimed at the same market as the lower CC EAL numbers (currently EAL1/2), and has been specifically designed for timescale and cost efficiency

Future 

As of September 2010, CESG have announced that the product assurance element of CCT Mark will be overtaken by the new Commercial Product Assurance (CPA) approach.  It is unclear as yet whether CCT Mark will remain in existence for assurance of Information Security services.

External links 
 The official website of the CESG Claims Tested Mark

References 

Computer security procedures
GCHQ
Information assurance standards
Internet in the United Kingdom